Alpheus is a genus of snapping shrimp of the family Alpheidae.  This genus contains in excess of 291 species, making this the most species-rich genus of shrimp. Like other snapping shrimp, the claws of Alpheus are asymmetrical, with one of the claws enlarged for making a popping noise. Some species in the genus enter into symbiotic relationships with gobiid fishes, and others associate with sea anemones. It's also the noisiest of all sea creatures and can immobilize small fish with its high pitched frequency.

Species
The following species are included:

Alpheus acutocarinatus De Man, 1909
Alpheus acutofemoratus Dana, 1852
Alpheus adamastor Coutière, 1908
Alpheus aequus W. Kim & Abele, 1988
Alpheus agilis Anker, Hurt & Knowlton, 2009
Alpheus agrogon Ramos, 1997
Alpheus albatrossae (Banner, 1953)
Alpheus alcyone De Man, 1902
Alpheus alpheopsides Coutière, 1905
Alpheus amblyonyx Chace, 1972
Alpheus amirantei Coutière, 1908
Alpheus anchistus De Man, 1920
Alpheus angulosus McClure, 2002
Alpheus angustilineatus Nomura & Anker, 2005
Alpheus antepaenultimus W. Kim & Abele, 1988
Alpheus architectus De Man, 1897
Alpheus arenensis (Chace, 1937)
Alpheus arenicolus Banner & Banner, 1983
Alpheus arethusa De Man, 1909
Alpheus armatus Rathbun, 1901
Alpheus armillatus H. Milne-Edwards, 1837
Alpheus arnoa Banner, 1957
Alpheus astrinx Banner & Banner, 1982
Alpheus australiensis Banner & Banner, 1982
Alpheus australosulcatus Banner & Banner, 1982
Alpheus avarus
Alpheus baccheti Anker, 2010
Alpheus bahamensis Rankin, 1898
Alpheus balaenodigitus Banner & Banner, 1982
Alpheus bannerorum Bruce, 1987e
Alpheus barbadensis (Schmitt, 1924)
Alpheus barbatus Coutière, 1897
Alpheus batesi Banner & Banner, 1964
Alpheus beanii Verrill, 1922
Alpheus belli Coutière, 1898
Alpheus bellimanus Lockington, 1877
Alpheus bellulus Miya & Miyake, 1969
Alpheus bicostatus De Man, 1908
Alpheus bidens (Olivier, 1811)
Alpheus bisincisus De Haan, 1849
Alpheus blachei Crosnier & Forest, 1965
Alpheus bouvieri A.Milne-Edwards, 1878
Alpheus brachymerus (Banner, 1953)
Alpheus bradypus Coutière, 1905
Alpheus brevicristatus De Haan, 1844
Alpheus brevipes Stimpson, 1860
Alpheus brevirostris (Olivier, 1811)
Alpheus brucei Banner & Banner, 1982
Alpheus bucephaloides Nobili, 1905
Alpheus bucephalus Coutière, 1905
Alpheus buchanorum Banner & Banner, 1983
Alpheus bullatus Barnard, 1955
Alpheus bunburius Banner & Banner, 1982
Alpheus californiensis Holmes, 1900
Alpheus canaliculatus Banner & Banner, 1968
Alpheus candei Guérin-Méneville, 1856
Alpheus cedrici Anker & de Grave, 2012
Alpheus chacei Carvacho, 1979
Alpheus chamorro Banner, 1956
Alpheus chilensis Coutière in Lenz, 1902
Alpheus chiragricus H. Milne-Edwards, 1837
Alpheus christofferseni Anker, Hurt & Knowlton, 2007
Alpheus clamator Lockington, 1877
Alpheus clypeatus Coutière, 1905
Alpheus coetivensis Coutière, 1908
Alpheus collumianus Stimpson, 1860
Alpheus colombiensis Wicksten, 1988
Alpheus compressus Banner & Banner, 1981
Alpheus confusus Carvacho, 1989
Alpheus coutierei De Man, 1909
Alpheus crassimanus Heller, 1865
Alpheus cremnus Banner & Banner, 1982
Alpheus crinitus Dana, 1852
Alpheus cristatus Coutière, 1897
Alpheus cristulifrons Rathbun, 1900
Alpheus crockeri (Armstrong, 1941)
Alpheus cylindricus Kingsley, 1878
Alpheus cythereus Banner & Banner, 1966
Alpheus dasycheles Coutière, 1908
Alpheus davaoensis Chace, 1988
Alpheus dentipes Guérin, 1832
Alpheus deuteropus Hilgendorf, 1879
Alpheus diadema Dana, 1852
Alpheus digitalis De Haan, 1844
Alpheus dissodontonotus Stebbing, 1915
Alpheus distinctus W. Kim & Abele, 1988
Alpheus djeddensis Coutière, 1897
Alpheus djiboutensis De Man, 1909
Alpheus dolerus Banner, 1956
Alpheus edamensis De Man, 1888
Alpheus edwardsii (Audouin, 1826)
Alpheus ehlersii De Man, 1909
Alpheus estuariensis Christoffersen, 1984
Alpheus euchirus Dana, 1852
Alpheus eulimene De Man, 1909
Alpheus euphrosyne De Man, 1897
Alpheus exilis W. Kim & Abele, 1988
Alpheus explorator Boone, 1935
Alpheus facetus De Man, 1908
Alpheus fagei Crosnier & Forest, 1965
Alpheus fasciatus Lockington, 1878
Alpheus fasqueli Anker, 2001
Alpheus felgenhaueri W. Kim & Abele, 1988
Alpheus fenneri Bruce, 1994
Alpheus firmus W. Kim & Abele, 1988
Alpheus floridanus Kingsley, 1878
Alpheus foresti Banner & Banner, 1981
Alpheus formosus Gibbes, 1850
Alpheus frontalis H.Milne-Edwards, 1837
Alpheus fujitai Nomura & Anker, 2005
Alpheus funafutensis Borradaile, 1899
Alpheus fushima Nomura, 2009
Alpheus galapagensis Sivertsen, 1933
Alpheus georgei Banner & Banner, 1982
Alpheus glaber (Olivi, 1792)
Alpheus gracilipes Stimpson, 1860
Alpheus gracilis Heller, 1861
Alpheus grahami Abele, 1975
Alpheus haanii Ortmann, A., 1890
Alpheus hailstonei Coutière, 1905
Alpheus halesii Kirk, 1887
Alpheus hebes W. Kim & Abele, 1988
Alpheus heeia Banner & Banner, 1974
Alpheus heronicus Banner & Banner, 1982
Alpheus heterocarpus (Yu, 1935)
Alpheus heterochaelis Say, 1818
Alpheus heurteli Coutière, 1897
Alpheus hippothoe De Man, 1888
Alpheus holthuisi Ribeiro, 1964
Alpheus homochirus (Yu, 1935)
Alpheus hoonsooi W. Kim & Abele, 1988
Alpheus hoplites Nobili, 1906
Alpheus hoplocheles Coutière, 1897
Alpheus hortensis Wicksten & McClure, 2003
Alpheus hululensis Coutière, 1905
Alpheus hutchingsae Banner & Banner, 1982
Alpheus hyeyoungae W. Kim & Abele, 1988
Alpheus hyphalus Chace, 1988
Alpheus idiocheles Coutière, 1905
Alpheus immaculatus Knowlton & Keller, 1983
Alpheus inca Wicksten & G. Méndez, 1981
Alpheus inopinatus Holthuis & Gottlieb, 1958
Alpheus intrinsecus Bate, 1888
Alpheus japonicus Miers, 1879
Alpheus javieri Anker, Hurt & Knowlton, 2009
Alpheus kagoshimanus Hayashi & Nagata, 2000
Alpheus kuroshimensis Nomura & Anker, 2005
Alpheus labis Banner & Banner, 1982
Alpheus lacertosus W. Kim & Abele, 1988
Alpheus ladronis Banner, 1956
Alpheus lanceloti Coutière, 1905
Alpheus lanceostylus Banner, 1959
Alpheus latus W. Kim & Abele, 1988
Alpheus lepidus De Man, 1908
Alpheus leptocheles Banner & Banner, 1975
Alpheus leptochiroides De Man, 1909
Alpheus leptochirus Coutière, 1905
Alpheus leviusculus Dana, 1852
Alpheus lobidens De Haan, 1849
Alpheus longecarinatus Hilgendorf, 1879
Alpheus longichaelis Carvacho, 1979
Alpheus longiforceps Hayashi & Nagata, 2002
Alpheus longinquus W. Kim & Abele, 1988
Alpheus lottini Guérin-Méneville, 1829
Alpheus lutosus Anker & De Grave, 2009
Alpheus macellarius Chace, 1988
Alpheus macrocheles (Hailstone, 1835)
Alpheus macroskeles Alcock & Anderson, 1899
Alpheus maindroni Coutière, 1898
Alpheus malabaricus (Fabricius, 1775)
Alpheus malleator Dana, 1852
Alpheus malleodigitus (Bate, 1888)
Alpheus martini W. Kim & Abele, 1988
Alpheus mazatlanicus Wicksten, 1983
Alpheus microrhynchus De Man, 1897
Alpheus microscaphis (Banner, 1959)
Alpheus microstylus (Bate, 1888)
Alpheus miersi Coutière, 1898
Alpheus migrans Lewinsohn & Holthuis, 1978
Alpheus millsae Anker, Hurt & Knowlton, 2007
Alpheus mitis Dana, 1852
Alpheus moretensis Banner & Banner, 1982
Alpheus naos Anker, Hurt & Knowlton, 2007
Alpheus nipa Banner & Banner, 1985
Alpheus nobili Banner & Banner, 1966
Alpheus nonalter Kensley, 1969
Alpheus normanni Kingsley, 1878
Alpheus notabilis Stebbing, 1915
Alpheus novaezealandiae Miers, 1876
Alpheus nuttingi (Schmitt, 1924)
Alpheus oahuensis (Banner, 1953)
Alpheus obesomanus Dana, 1852
Alpheus ovaliceps Coutière, 1905
Alpheus pachychirus Stimpson, 1860
Alpheus pacificus Dana, 1852
Alpheus packardii Kingsley, 1880
Alpheus paludicola Kemp, 1915
Alpheus panamensis Kingsley, 1878
Alpheus papillosus Banner & Banner, 1982
Alpheus paracrinitus Miers, 1881
Alpheus paradentipes Coutière, 1905
Alpheus paraformosus Anker, Hurt & Knowlton, 2008
Alpheus paralcyone Coutière, 1905
Alpheus paralpheopsides Coutière, 1905
Alpheus parasocialis Banner & Banner, 1982
Alpheus pareuchirus Coutière, 1905
Alpheus parvimaculatus Nomura & Anker, 2005
Alpheus parvirostris Dana, 1852
Alpheus parvus De Man, 1909
Alpheus peasei (Armstrong, 1940)
Alpheus percyi Coutière, 1908
Alpheus perezi Coutière, 1908
Alpheus perplexus Banner, 1956
Alpheus philoctetes De Man, 1909
Alpheus platydactylus Coutière, 1897
Alpheus platyunguiculatus (Banner, 1953)
Alpheus polystictus Knowlton & Keller, 1985
Alpheus polyxo De Man, 1909
Alpheus pontederiae Rochebrune, 1883
Alpheus pouang Christoffersen, 1979
Alpheus praedator De Man, 1908
Alpheus proseuchirus De Man, 1908
Alpheus pseudopugnax (Banner, 1953)
Alpheus puapeba Christoffersen, 1979
Alpheus pubescens De Man, 1908
Alpheus pugnax Dana, 1852
Alpheus purpurilenticularis Karplus & Ben Tuvia, 1979 
Alpheus pustulosus Banner & Banner, 1968
Alpheus quasirapacida Chace, 1988
Alpheus randalli Banner & Banner, 1980
Alpheus rapacida De Man, 1908
Alpheus rapax Fabricius, 1798
Alpheus rectus W. Kim & Abele, 1988
Alpheus ribeiroa Anker & Dworschak, 2004
Alpheus richardsoni Yaldwyn, 1971
Alpheus richpalmeri Anker, 2020
Alpheus romensky Burukovsky, 1990
Alpheus roquensis Knowlton & Keller, 1985
Alpheus roseodigitalis Nomura & Anker, 2005
Alpheus rostratus W. Kim & Abele, 1988
Alpheus rugimanus A. Milne-Edwards, 1878
Alpheus samoa Banner & Banner, 1966
Alpheus savuensis De Man, 1908
Alpheus saxidomus Holthuis, 1980
Alpheus schmitti Chace, 1972
Alpheus scopulus W. Kim & Abele, 1988
Alpheus serenei Tiwari, 1964
Alpheus sibogae De Man, 1908
Alpheus simus Guérin-Méneville, 1856
Alpheus sizou Banner & Banner, 1967
Alpheus socialis Heller, 1862
Alpheus soelae Banner & Banner, 1986
Alpheus soror Bruce, 1999
Alpheus spatulatus Banner & Banner, 1968
Alpheus splendidus Coutière, 1897
Alpheus spongiarum Coutière, 1897
Alpheus stanleyi Coutière, 1908
Alpheus stantoni Banner & Banner, 1986
Alpheus staphylinus Coutière, 1908
Alpheus stephensoni Banner & Smalley, 1969
Alpheus strenuus Dana, 1852
Alpheus styliceps Coutière, 1905
Alpheus sublucanus (Forsskål, 1775)
Alpheus sudara Banner & Banner, 1966
Alpheus sulcatus Kingsley, 1878
Alpheus suluensis Chace, 1988
Alpheus supachai Banner & Banner, 1966
Alpheus superciliaris Coutière, 1905
Alpheus talismani Coutière, 1898
Alpheus tasmanicus Banner & Banner, 1982
Alpheus tenuicarpus De Man, 1908
Alpheus tenuipes De Man, 1910
Alpheus tenuis W. Kim & Abele, 1988
Alpheus thomasi Hendrix & Gore, 1973
Alpheus tirmiziae Kazmi, 1974
Alpheus tricolor Anker, 2001
Alpheus triphopus Nobili, 1906
Alpheus tuberculosus Osorio, 1892
Alpheus tungii Banner & Banner, 1966
Alpheus umbo W. Kim & Abele, 1988
Alpheus utriensis Ramos & von Prahl, 1989
Alpheus vanderbilti Boone, 1930
Alpheus villosus (Olivier, 1811)
Alpheus villus W. Kim & Abele, 1988
Alpheus viridari (Armstrong, 1949)
Alpheus waltervadi Kensley, 1969
Alpheus websteri Kingsley, 1880
Alpheus wickstenae Christoffersen & Ramos, 1987
Alpheus williamsi Bruce, 1994
Alpheus xanthocarpus Anker, Hurt & Knowlton, 2008
Alpheus xishaensis R. Liu & Lan, 1980
Alpheus zimmermani Anker, 2007
Alpheus zulfaquiri Kazmi, 1982

References

Alpheidae
Decapod genera
Taxa named by Johan Christian Fabricius